Valle d'Aosta Calcio was an Italian association football club, based in Aosta, Aosta Valley.

History

The two previous bankruptcies

From the foundation to Aosta 1911 
The origins of the team go back to 1911 when Augusta Praetoria Sports was founded. The club, became A.S. Aosta in 1931 and U.S. Aosta 1911 in 1945, has played in Serie C from the season 1941–42 to 1942–43, from 1945–46 to 1947-48 and in the year 1951–52. U.S. Aosta 1911 went bankrupt in 1998 after having played the last season in Promozione Piedmont and Aosta Valley.

Valle d'Aosta Calcio 
U.S. Valle d’Aosta Chatillon Saint Vincent Fenusma was founded in 1997, acquiring the sports title of Serie D club U.S. Châtillon Saint Vincent based in Saint-Vincent. The club became Valle d’Aosta Calcio in 2000, transferring its seat to Aosta.

Aosta Valley was the champion of 2007–08 Eccellenza Piedmont Group; Aosta Valley relegated from 2009–10 Serie D to Eccellenza two year after.

The club bankrupt in 2010, after the relegation .

Football in Aosta Valley now
Since 2010, A.S.D. Vallée d’Aoste Charvensod have claimed to be the heir of the club, however the sports title and assets have never been acquired. In 2012 when Saint-Christophe was promoted to Lega Pro Seconda Divisione, the club changed their common name to just Vallée d’Aoste in order to represent the whole valley. The team, however, has no intentions to acquire the sports title and assets.

Colors and badge 
The team's colors are red and black.

References

Football clubs in Italy
Football clubs in Piedmont and Aosta Valley
Association football clubs established in 1911
Association football clubs disestablished in 2010
Serie C clubs
Aosta
1911 establishments in Italy
2010 disestablishments in Italy